The sports under the umbrella of athletics, particularly track and field, use a variety of statistics.  In order to report that information efficiently, numerous abbreviations have grown to be common in the sport. Starting in 1948 by Bert Nelson and Cordner Nelson, Track & Field News became the leader in creating and defining abbreviations in this field. These abbreviations have also been adopted by, among others, World Athletics; the world governing body, various domestic governing bodies, the Association of Track and Field Statisticians, the Association of Road Racing Statisticians, the Associated Press, and the individual media outlets who receive their reports. These abbreviations also appear in Wikipedia.

Times and marks
Almost all races record a time.  Evolving since experiments in the 1930s, to their official use at the 1968 Summer Olympics and official acceptance in 1977, fully automatic times have become common.  As this evolution has occurred, the rare early times were specified as FAT times. As they are now commonplace, automatic times are now expressed using the hundredths of a second. Hand times (watches operated by human beings) are not regarded as accurate and thus are only accepted to the accuracy of a tenth of a second even when the watch displays greater accuracy. If the mark was set before 1977, a converted time to the tenth was recorded for record purposes, because they did not have a system to compare between the timing methods. Frequently in those cases there is a mark to the 100th retained for that race.  Over this period of evolution, some reports show hand times also followed with an "h" or "ht" to distinguish hand times.

With two different timing methods came the inevitable desire to compare times. Track and Field News initiated adding .24 to hand times as a conversion factor.  Many electronic hand stopwatches display times to the hundredth. Frequently those readings are recorded, but are not accepted as valid (leading to confused results). Some low level meets have even hand timed runners and have switched places according to the time displayed on the stopwatch.  All of this is, of course, wrong.  Hand times are not accurate enough to be accepted for record purposes for short races. Human reaction time is not perfectly identical between different human beings. Hand times involve human beings reacting, pushing the stopwatch button when they see the smoke or hear the sound of the starting pistol, then reacting (possibly anticipating) the runner crossing the finish line. The proper procedure for converting hand times would be to round any hundredths up to the next higher even tenth of a second and then add the .24 to get a time for comparison purposes only.  But many meets displayed the converted marks accurate to the hundredth making the results look like they were taken with fully automatic timing.  In these cases, some meets have displayed a 4 or a 0 in the hundredths column for all races.  When detected, reports of these times are followed by a "c" or ' to indicate converted times.

Road race times are only considered accurate to a full second. To distinguish a full second time with hours, from a minute time with hundredths of a second, colons are used to separate hours from minutes, and minutes from seconds.  A period is used to separate seconds from hundredths of a second.

Transponder timing is becoming more common. The RFID detection system times the transponder chip, usually located on a runner's shoe as opposed to the official timing of the torso. Accurate to a full second, this is not significant, but in breaking microscopic ties, the data does not correspond to timing rules.  Most road races cannot fit all participants onto the start line.  Depending on the size of the field, some athletes could be several city blocks away from the start line and in the large crowd, could take minutes to get across the line. Results frequently indicate two times, the "gun time" would be the official time from the firing of the starting pistol, but the mat time shows the time the shoe crossed a sensing mat at the start line to the time the shoe crossed the sensing mat at the finish line.

Occasionally, when breaking ties using photo finish, times are displayed to the thousandth of a second.  These times to the thousandth are not used for record purposes but times to the thousandth can be used to break ties between adjacent heats.  Rules specify if a tie is broken this way, that all heats involved are recorded with the same timing system.

Records
Most records are subject to ratification by the governing body for that record. On the world level, that is World Athletics. Each body has their own procedure for ratifying the records: for example, USA Track & Field (USATF), the governing body for the United States, only ratifies records once a year at their annual meeting at the beginning of December.

Until a record is ratified, it is regarded as "Pending" which is sometimes indicated by a following P.

 WR – world record
 OR – Olympic record
 CR – championship record
 GR – games record
 PR – Paralympic Games record
 AR – area (or continental) record
 ER – European record
 NR – national record (for a specific country)
 MR – meet record (meeting record)
 DLR – Diamond League record
When a U20 is added, it indicates an under-20 record, which indicates an athlete under 20 years of age before a given calendar age. Otherwise, the athlete is considered senior.
 WU20R – world under-20 record (formerly WJR – world junior record) 
 AU20R – area (or continental) under-20 record (formerly AJR – area junior record) 
 NU20R – national under-20 record (for a specific country) (formerly NJR – national junior record) 
 # – the performance has not been accepted as a record, or there is some sort of irregularity with the result
 X – the athlete has been disqualified after the performance (usually, this is for taking performance-enhancing substance)

Bests
Some records are ratified or tracked, but they are not to the same standard of quality or accuracy as a record.  The term is "bests."  IAAF lists bests for the Youth division and for road-racing records such as the marathon.  It also tracks athlete personal achievements as bests.  A Y indicates Youth.  A youth athlete has not reached or will not reach their 18th birthday in the calendar year of competition.

 WYB – world under-18 best (the best mark achieved by an athlete in the youth category) (formerly world youth best)
 WB – world best (the best mark recorded for a non-IAAF world record event)
 AB – area (or continental) best (the best mark recorded for a non-IAAF world record event)
 NB – national best (the best mark recorded for a non-national federation record event)
 PB – personal best (the best mark achieved by an athlete on a personal level)
 SB – season's best (the best mark achieved by an athlete on a personal level within a given season)
 WL – world leading (the best mark achieved worldwide within a given season)
 EL – European leading (Europe leading) (the best mark achieved throughout Europe within a given season)

Circumstances and conditions
 A – mark set at altitude
 IRM – irregular measurement
 w – mark of wind assistance 
 NWI – no wind information (or no wind instrument)

For events where wind assistance is a factor (outdoor races 200 metres or less, long jump and triple jump), the wind reading is usually reported in metres per second (m/s).

 + – time was taken at an intermediate distance in a longer race
 a – (in a road race) course not record-eligible according to World Athletics rule 260.28
 AC – also competed
 c – converted mark
 dh – downhill
 DNF – did not finish
 DNS – did not start
 DQ – disqualified
 h – hand timed
 i – indoors
 Mx – mixed-gender race
 n – non-winning time
 ND – no distance
 NT – no time
 OT – oversized track
 q – secondary qualifier, by next best time or distance to complete the prescribed field size, rather than achieving a place or measurement goal
 qR – advanced to the next round by referee
 qJ – advanced to the next round by jury appeal
 Q – automatic qualifier in a major competition (see qualifying standards in athletics)
 Wo – women-only race
 y – race measurement in yards

Field events
 o – a cleared height in high jump or pole vault
 x – a missed height in high jump or pole vault
 r – athlete retired from competition
 NH – no height
 NM – no mark

Disqualifications
Athlete disqualifications often reference the IAAF rule number under which the athlete was disqualified.

This is typically written in the format (false start as example): DQ R162.7.

40.1 – Doping violation during or in connection with the championships
40.8 – Prior doping violation leading to suspension during the period of the championships
41.1 – Doping violation by one or more relay team members
142.4 – Failure to participate honestly with bona fide effort
144.2 – Giving or receiving assistance (e.g. pacing, use of electronic devices)
145.2 – Acting in an unsporting or improper manner (unsportsmanlike conduct)
149 - Entry to championships on the grounds of invalid performances
162.7 – False start
163.2 – Jostling or obstructing another athlete on the track
163.3 – Running out of lane
163.5 – Running out of lane (before 800 m breakline)
168.6 – Knocking down hurdle out of lane
168.7 – Illegal hurdle clearance or deliberately knocking down hurdle
170.6 – Baton not carried by hand; gloves or substances worn to give a better grip of the baton
170.6c – Dropped baton not retrieved by the athlete who dropped it
170.7 – Baton not passed within take-over zone
170.8 – Obstructing another team by athlete without baton
170.11 – Unverified team composition or running order
170.17 – Outgoing runner in  relay begins running or breaks from lane too early
218.4 – Illegal change of position by waiting relay runner (indoor events)
230.6a – Failure to comply with definition of race walking according to three different judges
240.8e – Illegal action by person authorised to hand refreshment to athlete
240.8f – More than two team officials stationed behind drinks table or running beside an athlete while taking on refreshment or water

Initialisms

Organising bodies
The various organizing bodies of the sport are abbreviated into alphabet soup.

 AAA – Amateur Athletic Association of England – England
 AAA – Asian Athletics Association
 AAU – Amateur Athletic Union USA amateur sports umbrella governing body formed 1887 until broken up in 1979 – USA
 AFI – Athletics Federation of India - India
 AK – Athletics Kenya – Kenya
 ANA – Authorised Neutral Athletes
 ANZ – Athletics New Zealand – New Zealand
 APA – Association of Panamerican Athletics – North and South America
 ARAF – All-Russia Athletic Federation – Russia
 ART – Athlete Refugee Team — Refugees
 BAAA – Bahamas Association of Athletic Associations – Bahamas
 BFLA – Belarus Athletic Federation – Belarus
 CAA – Confederation of African Athletics
 CACAC – Central American and Caribbean Athletic Confederation – Central America and Caribbean
 CBAt – Confederação Brasileira de Atletismo – Brasil
 CISM – International Military Sports Council – Military athletics
 CONSUDATLE – Confederación Sudamericana de Atletismo – South America
 CTAA – Chinese Taipei Athletics Association – Taiwan
 DAF – Danish Athletics Federation – Denmark
 DLFV – 1949–1990 Athletics Federation of East Germany
 DLV – Deutscher Leichtathletik-Verband – Germany
 EAA or EA – European Athletic Association/European Athletics
 EAF – Egyptian Athletic Federation – Egypt
 EKJL – Eesti Kergejõustikuliit – Estonia
 FCA – Federación Cubana de Atletismo – Cuba
 FFA – Fédération française d'athlétisme – France
 FRMA – Fédération Royale Marocaine d’Athlétisme – Morocco
 FIDAL – Federazione Italiana di Atletica Leggera – Italy
 FISU – International University Sports Federation – Student athletics
 HKAAA – Hong Kong Association of Athletics Affiliates – Hong Kong. Hong Kong Amateur Athletic Association is sometimes used.
 IAAF – International Association of Athletics Federations – World
 IAU – International Association of Ultrarunners
 IOC – International Olympic Committee – Olympics
 IPC – International Paralympic Committee – Paralympic athletics
 JAAA – Jamaica Athletics Administrative Association – Jamaica. Jamaica Amateur Athletic Association is sometimes used.
 JAAF – Japan Association of Athletics Federations – Japan
 KAAF –  — South Korea
 KNAU – Royal Dutch Athletics Federation – Netherlands
 OAA – Oceania Athletics Association
 NACAC – North American, Central American and Caribbean Athletic Association – North America
 NCAA – National Collegiate Athletic Association – USA Colleges and Universities
 NFHS – National Federation of State High School Associations – USA High Schools
 QAF – Qatar Athletics Federation – Qatar
 RFEA – Real Federación Española de Atletismo – Spain
 TAC – The Athletics Congress, predecessor to USA Track & Field 1979–1992 – USA
 TAF – Turkish Athletic Federation – Turkey
 UKA – UK Athletics – United Kingdom
 USATF – USA Track & Field – USA
 WA – World Athletics – World
 WAVA – 1977–2001 World Association of Veteran Athletes – World Masters (athletes over age 35)
 WMA – since 2001 World Masters Athletics – World Masters (athletes over age 35)
 WMRA – World Mountain Running Association

Publications and statisticians

 ARRS – Association of Road Racing Statisticians
 ATFS – Association of Track and Field Statisticians
 AW – Athletics Weekly
 NUTS – National Union of Track Statisticians – United Kingdom
 T&FN – Track & Field News

Events
Due to the large number of athletics events that are regularly contested, presentations of results and statistics often use abbreviations to refer to the events, rather than the full form.

CE – Combined events
DMR – Distance medley relay
DT – Discus throw
HJ – High jump
HM – Half marathon
HT – Hammer throw
JT – Javelin throw
LJ – Long jump
mh or mH – metres hurdles (e.g. 400mh for 400 metres hurdles)
PV – Pole vault
SMR – Sprint medley relay
SP – Shot put
SC, st. or s'chase – Steeplechase
TJ – Triple jump
WT – Weight throw
XC or CC – Cross country running

Competitions

AAG – African Games
AfC – African Championships in Athletics
AsC – Asian Athletics Championships
CWG – Commonwealth Games
DL – Diamond League
EC or ECh – European Athletics Championships
ECCC – European Cross Country Championships
EIC – European Athletics Indoor Championships
EJC – European Athletics Junior Championships
EG – European Games
ETC – European Team Championships
ESAA – English Schools' Athletics Championships
ISTAF – Internationales Stadionfest Berlin
LYG – London Youth Games
OG – Olympic Games
WC or WCh – World Championships in Athletics
WHM – World Half Marathon Championships
WIC – World Indoor Championships
WJC – World Junior Championships in Athletics
WXC – World Cross Country Championships
WYC – IAAF World Youth Championships in Athletics
PAG – Pan American Games
SAG – South Asian Games
SEAG – Southeast Asian Games

References

External links
 GBR Athletics abbreviations
 Terms & Abbreviations (World Athletics)

Lists of abbreviations
Sport of athletics terminology
Glossaries of sports
Wikipedia glossaries using unordered lists